Ymer Saraçi was an Albanian politician and mayor of Elbasan from 1939 through 1942.

References

See also
Alush Saraçi

Year of birth missing
Year of death missing
Mayors of Elbasan